Webster Bank is an American commercial bank based in Stamford, Connecticut. It has 177 branches and 316 ATMs located in Connecticut; Massachusetts; Rhode Island; and Westchester County, New York.

History 
Webster was founded in 1935 by Harold Webster Smith as the First Federal Savings of Waterbury in Connecticut. Only 24 years old, Smith borrowed from family and friends to found the lending institution providing home loans to Connecticut citizens. He served as CEO until 1987 and as chairman of the board until 1995 when First Federal was renamed Webster Bank in his honor.

Timeline 
Among milestones in Webster's history:
 1935: Harold Webster Smith founds a savings and loan, First Federal Savings of Waterbury.
 1938: First Federal's assets grow to more than $1 million.
 1986: First Federal converts to stock ownership and forms a holding company.
 1987: James C. Smith becomes the company's second chief executive officer, succeeding his father, Harold Webster Smith, who continues as chairman.
 1995: Harold Webster Smith retires as chairman and is succeeded by James C. Smith.
 1997: Webster Trust Company, N.A. and Investment Services are added to the bank's offerings.
 1998: Webster acquires Eagle Bank of Bristol, pushing its statewide branch total over 100.
 1998: Webster becomes first bank in Connecticut to purchase an insurance agency (Damman Insurance).
 2002: Webster becomes listed on the New York Stock Exchange under the ticker symbol, “WBS”.
 2003: Webster announces definitive agreement to acquire FIRSTFED AMERICA BANCORP, INC., the holding company for First Federal Savings Bank of America; the deal, which closed in May 2004, marks Webster's first retail expansion beyond Connecticut's borders and into the southeastern Massachusetts and Rhode Island markets.
 2004: Webster announces that the Office of the Comptroller of the Currency (OCC) has accepted the company's application to be a chartered commercial bank.
 2005: Webster acquires HSA Bank and becomes the leading bank administrator and trustee of health savings accounts in the nation.
 2006: Webster acquires NewMil Bank.
 2016: Webster acquires 17 Citibank branches in the Boston area and adds additional ATMs to support the network
 2022: Webster acquires Sterling National Bank and moves its headquarters from Waterbury to Stamford.

Company
Webster Financial Corporation is the holding company for Webster Bank, N.A. and Webster Insurance.  Webster Bank owns the asset-based lending firm Webster Business Credit Corporation, the insurance premium finance company Budget Installment Corporation, Webster Capital Finance, and provides health savings account trustee and administrative services through HSA Bank of Sheboygan, Wisconsin, a division of Webster Bank.

In 2015, Webster Bank had over $24 billion in assets and a market capitalization of over $3 billion. Its network included over 177 branches and 316 ATMs located in Connecticut; Massachusetts; Rhode Island; and Westchester County, New York.

After the $5 billion USD 2022 merger with Sterling, assets rose to $65 billion, with 202 branches, 380 ATMs, and a larger presence throughout the metropolitan New York city area, including New Jersey.

References

External links
Official site

Companies listed on the New York Stock Exchange
Companies based in Stamford, Connecticut
Banks based in Connecticut
American companies established in 1935
Banks established in 1935
1935 establishments in Connecticut
2002 initial public offerings